KK Lirija is a defunct basketball club based in Skopje, North Macedonia. They played in the Macedonian First League until the season 2013/2014.

History
The club was founded on 1977.

Domestic Achievements
 Macedonian Cup Finalist - 2014

Notable former players

 Toni Simić
 Dime Tasovski
 Nenad Zivčević
 Boban Stajić
 Bojan Trajkovski
 Goran Samardziev
 Enes Hadžibulić
 Miroslav Despotović
 Kiril Pavlovski
 Siniša Avramovski
 Aleksandar Ugrinoski
 Nikola Karakolev
 Muhamed Tači
 Aleksandar Sovkovski
 Ivan Sazdov
 Carlos Morban
 James Life
 Nemanja Jelesijević
 Darko Matić
 Djordje Jovanović
 Vladimir Filipović
 Boško Jovović
 Aleksandar Kalanj
 Aleksej Nešović
 Aleksandar Radojević
 Balša Radunović
 Marko Mijović
 Tyrone Nared
 Julius Coles
 Dustin Mitchell
 Edmond Azemi

References

External links
 Team info from Eurobasket

Basketball teams in North Macedonia
Sport in Skopje